Emerson station can refer to:

 Emerson railway station, a commuter rail station in Adelaide, Australia
 Emerson station (New Jersey), a New Jersey Transit commuter rail station
 Emerson station (New York), a former rapid transit station in Rochester
 Emerson Park railway station, a London Overground station
 Emerson Park station (MetroLink), a St. Louis MetroLink station